Stephen Joseph Ledogar (September 14, 1929 – May 3, 2010) was a United States ambassador and diplomat.

Born in New York City, Ledogar graduated from Fordham University in 1954, where he later received his law degree in 1958. He served in the United States Navy 1949-1952 and the Navy Reserve 1954–1960. In the Navy, he was a Lieutenant and naval aviator. He drafted three international arms control treaties and served in three different administrations. A resident of Guttenberg, New Jersey, Ledogar died of bladder cancer on May 3, 2010.

Notes

External links

1929 births
2010 deaths
People from Guttenberg, New Jersey
Fordham University alumni
Deaths from cancer in New Jersey
Deaths from bladder cancer
Military personnel from New York City
Ambassadors of the United States
United States Navy officers
United States Navy reservists
United States Naval Aviators
Military personnel from New Jersey